The Red Line of IndyGo is a bus rapid transit line serving parts of central, northern, and southern Indianapolis. The first phase of this transit route entered service on September 1, 2019, and was originally free for the first month; the free service was extended to the second and third months due to problems with the fare collection system. The Red Line links Broad Ripple to the University of Indianapolis via Downtown Indianapolis.

History 

On May 31, 2018, IndyGo began construction of the Red Line, the city's first Bus Rapid Transit (BRT) line. The first phase of the system opened on September 1, 2019, after about 15 months of construction and testing. The $96.3 million project included a $75 million grant from the Federal Transit Administration. Two additional BRT lines (Purple Line and Blue Line) are presently planned, along with proposed extensions on both ends of the Red Line. The Red Line has been assigned IndyGo Route #90.

The Red Line serves Marion County with eventual service extensions planned to County Line Road/Madison Avenue at the southern boundary with Johnson County and a still undetermined alignment to the northern boundary with Hamilton County. A Johnson County extension to Smith Valley Road in Greenwood  has been approved with early design work funded. A Hamilton County extension to Grand Park in Westfield has been proposed with early design work funded.

At introduction, every second BRT vehicle continued along the then proposed route of the Red Line beyond the completed BRT stations as "Route 90 - Red Line Local." This local line stopped at traditional bus stops to continue service to the northern and southern boundaries of Marion County. Due to traffic issues and low ridership, IndyGo discontinued this service. Since then, northbound service terminates at the 66th/College station and southbound service terminates at the University (Campus/Shelby) station. Dedicated local routes now provide supplementary service with Route 901 traveling as far north as 91st Street and Route 902 traveling as far south as County Line Road.

Due to Red Line buses failing to meet contractually obligated mileage ranges, bus manufacturer BYD paid for them to be retrofitted with inductive charging plates. These plates enable inductive charging of the buses en route to reduce service disruption. One inductive charging station was installed near the 66th/College station, another was planned near Madison Ave/County Line Rd, and a third planned near Ivy Tech Community College – Lawrence Campus.

Station listing
There are at present 28 stations on the Red Line. All stations are served by all Red Line vehicles, but every other bus continues on beyond the last station to the county line as Route 90 - Red Line Local. Those that do not continue on to execute the turnaround procedure from the station as detailed in the Red Line operations manual.

See also 
 Transportation in Indianapolis

References

External links 
 IndyGo Red Line home page

Transportation in Indianapolis
Bus rapid transit in Indiana
2019 establishments in Indiana
Transport infrastructure completed in 2019